Sans souci is French for "no worries" or "carefree".

Sans Souci, Sans-souci, or Sanssouci may also refer to:

Place names

Australia
Sans Souci, New South Wales, a suburb of Sydney

Canada
Sans Souci, Ontario, a community located on Frying Pan Island, in Georgian Bay

Caribbean
Sans Souci, a neighborhood Santo Domingo, Dominican Republic
Sans Souci, a neighborhood in the Eastern District of the Island of New Providence, Bahamas
Sans-Souci Palace, Haiti
Sans Souci, a village on the island of Wakenaam, Guyanna

Germany
 Sanssouci, the summer palace of Frederick the Great, King of Prussia, in Potsdam, Germany
 Sanssouci Park, the park surrounding the palace

South Africa
Sans Souci, KwaZulu-Natal, a settlement near the lower Tugela River

United States
Sans Souci, Arkansas, an unincorporated community in Mississippi County
Sans Souci, Florida, a place in Florida
Sans Souci, Michigan, an unincorporated community
Sans Souci,  a neighborhood of New Rochelle, New York
Sans Souci, South Carolina, a census-designated place
Sans Souci Beach, an 1890s resort in Honolulu, Hawaii, named by George Lycurgus
Sans Souci Island, an island located in the Cedar River at Waterloo, Iowa
Sans Souci Valley, the former name of a valley in San Francisco

Buildings and structures

Houses
Sans Souci, a plantation in Caernarvon, Louisiana
Sans Souci, Mumbai, the palatial house of David Sassoon, now the Masina Hospital
Davenport House (New Rochelle, New York), also known as "Sans Souci", an NRHP gothic-revival estate in New Rochelle, New York
Sans Souci (Hillsborough, North Carolina), a house in Hillsborough, North Carolina

Palaces
Sans-Souci Palace, a once royal palace erected in Cap Haitian by Henry I, King of Haiti, in early 19th century
Sanssouci, the former summer palace of Frederick the Great, King of Prussia, in Potsdam, Germany
Bogor Palace, West Java, Indonesia, in colonial times also called Buitenzorg and Sans Souci

Arts, entertainment, and media
 The Flute Concert of Sanssouci (1930), a German drama film
 "Sans Souci", a 1828 poem by Letitia Elizabeth Landon, published in The Bijou annual
Sans Souci, a hotel in the fictional seaside town of Leahampton in Agatha Christie's mystery novel N or M?

Music
Sans Souci (album), 2003 album by Australian band Frenzal Rhomb

Songs
"Sans Souci", a composition by Sonny Burke and Peggy Lee on the 1989 album The Peggy Lee Songbook: There'll Be Another Spring
"Sans Souci", the alma mater song of Columbia College, Columbia University, New York City; see Stand, Columbia
"Sanssouci" (song), a song by Rufus Wainwright, from his album Release the Stars

Theatres
 Sans Souci Theatre, London, 1796–1830s
 Sans Souci Theatre (Calcutta), India, 1839–1849

Television
Sans Souci is a restaurant in Season 1, Episode 12 "Capitol Offense" (Murder, She Wrote)

People
Emery J. San Souci, governor of Rhode Island in 1921
Robert D. San Souci (1946–2014), American author and folklorist
Jean-Baptiste Sans Souci (died 1803), leader of rebel slaves during the Haitian Revolution
George SanSouci, American pool player
Armand G. Sansoucy (1910–1983), American politician from Maine
Brigitte Sansoucy, 21st-century Canadian politician
Sans Souci, pseudonym of American author Nelly Nichol Marshall (1845–1898)

Other uses
Sans Souci Cabaret, a nightclub near Havana, Cuba
USS Sans Souci II (SP-301), a United States Navy patrol vessel in commission from 1917 to 1919
USS Sans Souci II (SP-301), a United States Navy patrol vessel in commission from 1917 to 1919
Sans Souci Girls' High School, Newlands, Cape Town, South Africa
Sans Souci, an Italian pale lager brand owned by Heineken International
 Sans Souci Parkway, a road connecting Nanticoke and Wilkes-Barre in Hanover Township, Luzerne County, Pennsylvania
Sans Souci is a restaurant in Season 1, Episode 12 "Capitol Offense" (Murder, She Wrote)

See also
San Soucis, a town on the island of St. Lucia